High Cliff State Park is a  Wisconsin state park near Sherwood, Wisconsin. It is the only state-owned recreation area located on Lake Winnebago. The park got its name from cliffs of the Niagara Escarpment, a land formation east of the shore of Lake Winnebago that stretches north through northeast Wisconsin, Upper Michigan, and Ontario to Niagara Falls and New York State.

A new Master Plan for the park created in 2013 aims to nearly double the size of the park, to add new amenities, and expand conservation efforts.

Activities and amenities
 Trails: Hiking trails include the  limestone-surfaced Indian Mound Trail. The north shoreline of Lake Winnebago can be seen from a  observation tower at the top of the escarpment. Various trails are available for biking, horseback riding, cross-country skiing, snowshoeing, and snowmobiling.
 The park also offers camping, picnicking, boating, swimming, fishing, and hunting.
 A statue of Red Bird, the Winnebago (Ho-Chunk) leader, overlooks the northeast end of Lake Winnebago.

Effigy mounds
The effigy mounds at the top of the escarpment have led to a small part of the park being added to the National Register of Historic Places, listed as High Cliff Mounds. A trail meanders through six long-tailed mounds and several conical mounds. Out of the original 30 effigy mounds in High Cliff, only nine remain, among them a panther mound that reaches 285 feet in length, as well as mounds presenting a bird and one that was most likely a bear. The mounds are consistent with other mound groups found at the peak of the Niagara Escarpment along the eastern shore of Lake Winnebago, including the Calumet County Park Group.

See also
 Mound
 Mound builder (people)
 Earthwork (archaeology)
 List of burial mounds in the United States

References

External links

 High Cliff State Park Wisconsin Department of Natural Resources
 High Cliff State Park 1982 Master Plan
 High Cliff State Park 2013 Master Plan

Mounds in Wisconsin
Archaeological sites on the National Register of Historic Places in Wisconsin
Native American history of Wisconsin
Niagara Escarpment
Protected areas of Calumet County, Wisconsin
Protected areas established in 1956
State parks of Wisconsin
Nature centers in Wisconsin
National Register of Historic Places in Calumet County, Wisconsin
1956 establishments in Wisconsin